The American Herald (1784-1790) was a newspaper in Boston and Worcester, Massachusetts, published by Edward Eveleth Powars and Nathaniel Willis.

Variant titles
 The American Herald: and the General Advertiser (Jan. 19, 1784-Mar. 29, 1784)
 The American Herald: and Federal Recorder (1788)
 American Herald; and the Worcester Recorder (1788)
 The American Herald, and the Washington Gazette (August 1790-Dec. 13, 1790)

References

Further reading

 Charles Evans. American Bibliography: 1790-1792. Chicago: Priv. print. for the author by the Columbia Press, 1914.

Publications established in 1784
Publications disestablished in 1790
History of Boston
18th century in Boston
Newspapers published in Boston
Defunct newspapers published in Massachusetts
1784 establishments in Massachusetts
1790 disestablishments in Massachusetts